Mark Boris Andrijanič (born 4 July 1983) is a Slovenian politician and lawyer.

Andrijanič was the first Minister for Digital Transformation of the Republic of Slovenia.

Career 
He attended the Škofija Classical High School in Ljubljana, where he studied English, French, French, Latin and Greek. After matriculation, he enrolled at the Faculty of Law of the University of Ljubljana, where he graduated with honors, and further studied at the University of Oxford, where he obtained the title of Master of Public Policy or MPP. After his studies, he became an economic adviser to the government of the African country of Sierra Leone, and then continued his work as a researcher at the Martens Center for European Studies in Brussels, where he mainly dealt with European digital and economic policies. In 2016, he joined Uber's Public Policy team for the Central and Eastern Europe region. He worked as the director of corporate affairs to establish partnerships with governments and cities aimed at promoting digital transformation and smart mobility solutions.

Politics
In April 2021, the 14th government of the Republic of Slovenia appointed him head of the Strategic Council for Digitization, the government's consultative body. On 17 July 2021 the government appointed him to a newly created position - he became a minister without portfolio responsible for digital transformation. It was approved in the National Assembly with 45 votes, 44 against. One of the more prominent decisions during his ministry was the introduction of digital vouchers worth 150 euros, which enabled pupils in the last triad of elementary schools, pupils and students to buy computer equipment. Vouchers were also given to citizens aged 55 or older who attended digital literacy training subsidized under the Digital Inclusion Promotion Act. The vouchers came into effect on 15 June 2022.

In April 2022, the World Economic Forum ranked him among the 110 most promising young global leaders.

References

1983 births
Slovenian politicians
New Slovenia politicians
Living people